The Madison Elementary School is a former elementary school in the Upper Hill neighborhood of Pittsburgh, Pennsylvania, was built in 1902, and added to in 1929. The exterior features ornately decorated Romanesque-inspired doors and windows. It was listed on the National Register of Historic Places in 1986.

References

Romanesque Revival architecture in Pennsylvania
Art Deco architecture in Pennsylvania
School buildings completed in 1902
School buildings on the National Register of Historic Places in Pennsylvania
Schools in Pittsburgh
City of Pittsburgh historic designations
Pittsburgh History & Landmarks Foundation Historic Landmarks
National Register of Historic Places in Pittsburgh
1902 establishments in Pennsylvania